De "Bambino" à "Il silenzio" was Dalida's first compilation album, released in France in 1967 by Barclay Records

Track listing
 "Bambino"
 "Gondolier"
 "Les Gitans"
 "Come prima" (Tu me donnes)
 "Ciao ciao bambina"
 "T'aimer follement"
 "Les enfants du Pirée"
 "Romantica"
 "Itsi bitsi petit bikini"
 "Garde-moi la dernière danse"
 "Le jour le plus long"
 "La danse de Zorba"
 "Il Silenzio (Bonsoir mon amour)"

See also
 Dalida
 List of Dalida songs
 Dalida albums discography
 Dalida singles discography

References
 Dalida Official Website

External links
 Dalida Official Website "Discography" section

Dalida albums
1967 compilation albums
French-language compilation albums
Barclay (record label) compilation albums
Italian-language compilation albums